Ticlio (or Anticona) is a mountain pass and the highest point (4,818 m or 15,807 ft) of the Central Highway of Peru (km 120), located in the Andes Mountains in the Chicla District, Huarochirí Province, Department of Lima. It used to be a railway crossing loop on the Ferrocarril Central Andino (FCCA) in Peru, whose main claim to fame was being the highest railway junction in the world.  The railway now crosses the pass through the nearby Galera Summit Tunnel at a lower elevation of 4,783 m (15,692 ft) and enters a different valley than the highway on the eastern side of the pass.

Overview
Ticlio Station lies at km 171 of the  standard gauge FCCA about 2 km (1.2 miles) from the highway summit at the western end of Galera Summit Tunnel. From 1893 to 1921, it was the junction for the now-closed branch to Morococha. FCCA is an active freight and passenger line (FCCA offers several tourist trips per month from Lima to Huancayo). On the railway approach to Ticlio from the direction of Lima, eight tunnels were necessary in a stretch of less than 3.2 km (2 miles).

Temperature varies between 8 and -5 °C. Atmospheric pressure in Ticlio is approximately 50% lower than the one present at sea level, which causes the vast majority of people that pass through this point to suffer altitude sickness or soroche.

See also
 Antikuna
 Qinghai–Tibet Railway
 Waqraqucha
 List of highest railway stations in the world

Gallery

References 
 http://mikes.railhistory.railfan.net/r022.html
  

Railway stations in Peru
Buildings and structures in Junín Region
Buildings and structures in Lima Region
Mountain passes of the Andes
Roads in Peru